Pseudo-Bonaventure is the name given to the authors of a number of medieval devotional works which were believed at the time to be the work of Bonaventure: "It would almost seem as if 'Bonaventura' came to be regarded as a convenient label for a certain type of text, rather than an assertion of authorship". Since it is clear a number of actual authors are involved, the term "Pseudo-Bonaventuran" is often used.  Many works now have other attributions of authorship which are generally accepted, but the most famous, the Meditations on the Life of Christ, remains usually described only as a work of  Pseudo-Bonaventure.

Other works
"Biblia pauperum" ("Poor Man's Bible" – a title only given in the 20th century), a short typological version of the Bible, also extremely popular, and often illustrated. There were different versions of this, the original perhaps by the Dominican Nicholas of Hanapis. 
Speculum Beatæ Mariæ Virginis by Conrad of Saxony
Speculum Disciplinæ, Epistola ad Quendam Novitium and Centiloquium, all probably by Bonanventura's secretary, Bernard of Besse  
Legend of Saint Clare
Theologia Mystica, probably by Hugh of Balma.
Philomena, a poem now attributed to John Peckham, Archbishop of Canterbury from 1279 to 1292.

References

 (Penultimate paragraph.)

Further reading

Meditationes de vita Christi
Lawrence F. Hundersmarck: The Use of Imagination, Emotion, and the Will in a Medieval Classic: The Meditaciones Vite Christi. In: Logos 6,2 (2003), S. 46–62
Sarah McNamer: Further evidence for the date of the Pseudo-Bonaventuran Meditationes vitæ Christi. In: Franciscan Studies, Bd. 10, Jg. 28 (1990), S. 235–261
Livario Oliger: Le meditationes vitae Christi del pseudo-Bonaventura. In: Studi Franciscani 18 (1921), S. 143–183; 19 (1922), S. 18–47
Giorgio Petrocchi: Sulla composizione e data delle Meditationes Vitae Christi. In: Convivium, N.S. 5 (1952), S. 757–778

Bonaventura
Balduin Distelbrink: Bonaventurae scripta: authentica, dubia vel spuria critice recensita. Istituto storico Cappuccini, Rom 1975 (= Subsidia scientifica Franciscalia, 5)

Christian theologians
Medieval Christian devotional writers
Medieval theologians